The 2020–21 Charlotte Hornets season was the 31st season of the franchise in the National Basketball Association (NBA). The Hornets were coached by James Borrego, in his third season as the team's head coach.

Following the 2019–20 NBA season, the Hornets qualified as a lottery team, receiving the 3rd overall pick in the 2020 NBA draft lottery.

The Hornets selected LaMelo Ball with the 3rd pick in the 2020 NBA draft, followed by Vernon Carey Jr. and Grant Riller in the second round. In a draft-night trade, the Hornets also acquired Nick Richards from the New Orleans Pelicans in exchange for a 2024 second-round pick.

On November 30, in a sign-and-trade deal with the Boston Celtics, the Hornets acquired Gordon Hayward and two future second-round picks in exchange for a protected 2022 second-round pick. On March 25, the Hornets acquired Brad Wanamaker, a protected 2022 second-round pick, and cash considerations from the Golden State Warriors in exchange for a protected 2025 second-round pick.

The Hornets season ended following a 144–117 loss to the Indiana Pacers in the NBA play-in tournament.

NBA draft

Roster

Standings

Division

Conference

Notes
 z – Clinched home court advantage for the entire playoffs
 c – Clinched home court advantage for the conference playoffs
 y – Clinched division title
 x – Clinched playoff spot
 pb – Clinched play-in spot
 o – Eliminated from playoff contention
 * – Division leader

Game log

Preseason

|-style="background:#fcc;"
| 1
| December 12
| Toronto
| 
| Miles Bridges (12)
| LaMelo Ball (10)
| LaMelo Ball (4)
| Spectrum Center
| 0–1
|-style="background:#fcc;"
| 2
| December 14
| Toronto
| 
| McDaniels, Rozier (15)
| Bridges, Washington (6)
| Graham, Hayward (6)
| Spectrum Center
| 0–2
|-style="background:#cfc;"
| 3
| December 17
| @ Orlando
| 
| Terry Rozier (20)
| Terry Rozier (7)
| Devonte' Graham (6)
| Amway Center
| 1–2
|-style="background:#fcc;"
| 4
| December 19
| @ Orlando
| 
| Devonte' Graham (25)
| Miles Bridges (15)
| Terry Rozier (6)
| Amway Center
| 1–3

Regular season

|-style="background:#fcc;"
| 1
| December 23
| @ Cleveland
| 
| Terry Rozier (42)
| Miles Bridges (6)
| Devonte' Graham (10)
| Rocket Mortgage FieldHouse300
| 0–1
|-style="background:#fcc;"
| 2
| December 26
| Oklahoma City
| 
| Terry Rozier (19)
| Bismack Biyombo (9)
| Devonte' Graham (10)
| Spectrum Center 0
| 0–2
|-style="background:#cfc;"
| 3
| December 27
|  Brooklyn
| 
| Gordon Hayward (28)
| P. J. Washington (12)
| Gordon Hayward (7)
| Spectrum Center 0
| 1–2
|-style="background:#cfc;"
| 4
| December 30
| @ Dallas
| 
| LaMelo Ball (22)
| Miles Bridges (16)
| Ball, Graham (5)
| American Airlines Center0
| 2–2

|-style="background:#fcc;"
| 5
| January 1
| Memphis
| 
| Bismack Biyombo (16)
| LaMelo Ball (6)
| Bismack Biyombo (12)
| Spectrum Center0
| 2–3
|-style="background:#fcc;"
| 6
| January 2
| @ Philadelphia
| 
| Terry Rozier (35)
| Devonte' Graham (9)
| Bismack Biyombo (9)
| Wells Fargo Center0
| 2–4
|-style="background:#fcc;"
| 7
| January 4
| @ Philadelphia
| 
| Gordon Hayward (18)
| Hayward, Washington (8)
| LaMelo Ball (9)
| Wells Fargo Center0
| 2–5
|-style="background:#cfc;"
| 8
| January 6
| @ Atlanta
| 
| Gordon Hayward (44)
| P. J. Washington (10)
| Devonte' Graham (7)
| State Farm Arena0
| 3–5
|-style="background:#cfc;"
| 9
| January 8
| @ New Orleans
| 
| Gordon Hayward (26)
| LaMelo Ball (10)
| LaMelo Ball (9)
| Smoothie King Center759
| 4–5
|-style="background:#cfc;"
| 10
| January 9
| Atlanta
| 
| Terry Rozier (23)
| LaMelo Ball (12)
| Lamelo Ball (11)
| Spectrum Center0
| 5–5
|-style="background:#cfc;"
| 11
| January 11
| New York
| 
| Gordon Hayward (34)
| LaMelo Ball (14)
| Ball, Graham (7)
| Spectrum Center0
| 6–5
|-style="background:#fcc;"
| 12
| January 13
| Dallas
| 
| Terry Rozier (18)
| P. J. Washington (10)
| Devonte' Graham (7)
| Spectrum Center0
| 6–6
|-style="background:#fcc;"
| 13
| January 14
| @ Toronto
| 
| Terry Rozier (22)
| P. J. Washington (11)
| LaMelo Ball (7)
| Amalie Arena0
| 6–7
|-style="background:#fcc;"
| 14
| January 16
| @ Toronto
| 
| Gordon Hayward (25)
| P. J. Washington (12)
| Devonte' Graham (7)
| Amalie Arena0
| 6–8
|-style="background:#ccc;"
| –
| January 20
| Washington
| colspan="6" | Postponed (COVID-19) (Makeup date: February 7)
|-style="background:#fcc;"
| 15
| January 22
| Chicago
| 
| Gordon Hayward (34)
| Bismack Biyombo (10)
| Devonte' Graham (6)
| Spectrum Center0
| 6–9
|-style="background:#cfc;"
| 16
| January 24
| @ Orlando
| 
| Gordon Hayward (39)
| Gordon Hayward (9)
| LaMelo Ball (8)
| Amway Center0
| 7–9
|-style="background:#fcc;"
| 17
| January 25
| @ Orlando
| 
| Hayward, Rozier (24)
| Biyombo, Zeller (7)
| Ball, Hayward, Washington (4)
| Amway Center3,167
| 7–10
|-style="background:#fcc;"
| 18
| January 27
| Indiana
| 
| Terry Rozier (20)
| Cody Zeller (14)
| Ball, Graham (5)
| Spectrum Center0
| 7–11
|-style="background:#cfc;"
| 19
| January 29
| Indiana
| 
| Rozier, Washington (19)
| P. J. Washington (9)
| Devonte' Graham (10)
| Spectrum Center0
| 8–11
|-style="background:#cfc;"
| 20
| January 30
| Milwaukee
| 
| Ball, Hayward (27)
| Cody Zeller (15)
| LaMelo Ball (9)
| Spectrum Center0
| 9–11

|-style="background:#cfc;"
| 21
| February 1
| @ Miami
| 
| Malik Monk (36)
| Cody Zeller (12)
| LaMelo Ball (7)
| American Airlines Arena0
| 10–11
|-style="background:#fcc;"
| 22
| February 3
| Philadelphia
| 
| Ball, Hayward (22)
| Bridges, Zeller (8)
| Gordon Hayward (9)
| Spectrum Center0
| 10–12
|-style="background:#fcc;"
| 23
| February 5
| Utah
| 
| LaMelo Ball (34)
| Gordon Hayward (10)
| LaMelo Ball (8)
| Spectrum Center0
| 10–13
|-style="background:#cfc;"
| 24
| February 7
| Washington
| 
| Terry Rozier (26)
| Miles Bridges (14)
| LaMelo Ball (5)
| Spectrum Center0
| 11–13
|-style="background:#cfc;"
| 25
| February 8
| Houston
| 
| LaMelo Ball (24)
| Miles Bridges (10)
| LaMelo Ball (10)
| Spectrum Center0
| 12–13
|-style="background:#fcc;"
| 26
| February 10
| @ Memphis
| 
| Terry Rozier (34)
| Miles Bridges (10)
| LaMelo Ball (5)
| FedEx Forum1,830
| 12–14
|-style="background:#cfc;"
| 27
| February 12
| Minnesota
| 
| Terry Rozier (41)
| LaMelo Ball (11)
| Gordon Hayward (5)
| Spectrum Center0
| 13–14
|-style="background:#fcc;"
| 28
| February 14
| San Antonio
| 
| Terry Rozier (33)
| Ball, Zeller (12)
| LaMelo Ball (8)
| Spectrum Center0
| 13–15
|-style="background:#ccc;"
| –
| February 17
| Chicago
| colspan="6" | Postponed (COVID-19) (Makeup date: May 6)
|-style="background:#ccc;"
| –
| February 19
| Denver
| colspan="6" | Postponed (COVID-19) (Makeup date: May 11)
|-style="background:#cfc;"
| 29
| February 20
| Golden State
| 
| Terry Rozier (36)
| Hayward, McDaniels (7)
| LaMelo Ball (7)
| Spectrum Center0
| 14–15
|-style="background:#fcc;"
| 30
| February 22
| @ Utah
| 
| Ball, Hayward (21)
| Ball, Zeller (7)
| Ball, Washington (4)
| Vivint Smart Home Arena3,902
| 14–16
|-style="background:#cfc;"
| 31
| February 24
| @ Phoenix
| 
| Malik Monk (29)
| Bismack Biyombo (11)
| LaMelo Ball (8)
| Phoenix Suns Arena3,296
| 15–16
|-style="background:#fcc;"
| 32
| February 26
| @ Golden State
| 
| Malik Monk (25)
| P. J. Washington (10)
| LaMelo Ball (6)
| Chase Center0
| 15–17
|-style="background:#cfc;"
| 33
| February 28
| @ Sacramento
| 
| P. J. Washington (42)
| Bridges, Washington (9)
| LaMelo Ball (12)
| Golden 1 Center0
| 16–17

|-style="background:#fcc;"
| 34
| March 1
| @ Portland
| 
| LaMelo Ball (30)
| Cody Martin (9)
| LaMelo Ball (8)
| Moda Center0
| 16–18
|-style="background:#cfc;"
| 35
| March 3
| @ Minnesota
| 
| Terry Rozier (31)
| Miles Bridges (10)
| Gordon Hayward (9)
| Target Center0
| 17–18
|-style="background:#cfc;"
| 36
| March 11
| Detroit
| 
| P. J. Washington (20)
| P. J. Washington (9)
| LaMelo Ball (9)
| Spectrum Center0
| 18–18
|-style="background:#cfc;"
| 37
| March 13
| Toronto
| 
| LaMelo Ball (23)
| LaMelo Ball (9)
| LaMelo Ball (6)
| Spectrum Center2,861
| 19–18
|-style="background:#cfc;"
| 38
| March 15
| Sacramento
| 
| Terry Rozier (26)
| Bismack Biyombo (10)
| Cody Zeller (6)
| Spectrum Center2,861
| 20–18
|-style="background:#fcc;"
| 39
| March 17
| @ Denver
| 
| Terry Rozier (21)
| P. J. Washington (6)
| Gordon Hayward (6)
| Ball Arena0
| 20–19
|-style="background:#fcc;"
| 40
| March 18
| @ L. A. Lakers
| 
| LaMelo Ball (26)
| Bridges, Hayward (9)
| Gordon Hayward (10)
| Staples Center0
| 20–20
|-style="background:#fcc;"
| 41
| March 20
| @ L. A. Clippers
| 
| Miles Bridges (21)
| Gordon Hayward (8)
| Terry Rozier (5)
| Staples Center0
| 20–21
|-style="background:#cfc;"
| 42
| March 22
| @ San Antonio
| 
| Gordon Hayward (27)
| P. J. Washington (13)
| Hayward, Rozier (6)
| AT&T Center3,222
| 21–21
|-style="background:#cfc;"
| 43
| March 24
| @ Houston
| 
| Terry Rozier (25)
| P. J. Washington (12)
| Monk, Rozier, Washington (4)
| Toyota Center3,163
| 22–21
|-style="background:#cfc;"
| 44
| March 26
| Miami
| 
| Malik Monk (32)
| Gordon Hayward (9)
| Terry Rozier (11)
| Spectrum Center4,215
| 23–21
|-style="background:#fcc;"
| 45
| March 28
| Phoenix
| 
| Devonte' Graham (30)
| Bridges, Washington (12)
| Cody Martin (4)
| Spectrum Center3,850
| 23–22
|-style="background:#cfc;"
| 46
| March 30
| @ Washington
| 
| Terry Rozier (27)
| Cody Zeller (13)
| Graham, Hayward (6)
| Capital One Arena0
| 24–22

|-style="background:#fcc;"
| 47
| April 1
| @ Brooklyn
| 
| Graham, Hayward (13)
| P. J. Washington (8)
| Malik Monk (4)
| Barclays Center1,773
| 24–23
|-style="background:#cfc;"
| 48
| April 2
| @ Indiana
| 
| Miles Bridges (23)
| Miles Bridges (10)
| Graham, Hayward (6)
| Bankers Life Fieldhouse0
| 25–23
|-style="background:#fcc;"
| 49
| April 4
| @ Boston
| 
| Terry Rozier (22)
| Rozier, Zeller (7)
| Devonte' Graham (6)
| TD Garden0
| 25–24
|-style="background:#cfc;"
| 50
| April 7
| @ Oklahoma City
| 
| Jalen McDaniels (21)
| Cody Zeller (14)
| Brad Wanamaker (6)
| Chesapeake Energy Arena0
| 26–24
|-style="background:#cfc;"
| 51
| April 9
| @ Milwaukee
| 
| Miles Bridges (26)
| Cody Zeller (12)
| Brad Wanamaker (7)
| Fiserv Forum3,280
| 27–24
|-style="background:#fcc;"
| 52
| April 11
| Atlanta
| 
| Miles Bridges (23)
| Cody Zeller (9)
| Devonte' Graham (7)
| Spectrum Center4,148
| 27–25
|-style="background:#fcc;"
| 53
| April 13
| L. A. Lakers
| 
| Devonte' Graham (19)
| Bismack Biyombo (12)
| Devonte' Graham (6)
| Spectrum Center3,676
| 27–26
|-style="background:#fcc;"
| 54
| April 14
| Cleveland
| 
| Terry Rozier (22)
| Bridges, Rozier, Cody Zeller (7)
| Terry Rozier (8)
| Spectrum Center2,955
| 27–27
|-style="background:#fcc"
| 55
| April 16
| @ Brooklyn
| 
| Terry Rozier (27)
| Miles Bridges (9)
| Terry Rozier (10)
| Barclays Center1,773
| 27–28
|-style="background:#cfc;"
| 56
| April 18
| Portland
| 
| Terry Rozier (34)
| Rozier, Washington (8)
| Terry Rozier (10)
| Spectrum Center3,880
| 28–28
|-style="background:#fcc;"
| 57
| April 20
| @ New York
| 
| P. J. Washington (26)
| Miles Bridges (14)
| Terry Rozier (8)
| Madison Square Garden1,753
| 28–29
|-style="background:#fcc;"
| 58
| April 22
| @ Chicago
| 
| Devonte' Graham (16)
| Cody Zeller (6)
| Terry Rozier (8)
| United Center0
| 28–30
|-style="background:#cfc;"
| 59
| April 23
| Cleveland
| 
| Bridges, Rozier, Washington (25)
| Bismack Biyombo (11)
| Devonte' Graham (10)
| Spectrum Center4,060
| 29–30
|-style="background:#cfc;"
| 60
| April 25
| Boston
| 
| Devonte' Graham (24)
| P. J. Washington (12)
| Terry Rozier (11)
| Spectrum Center4,493
| 30–30
|-style="background:#fcc;"
| 61
| April 27
| Milwaukee
| 
| Devonte' Graham (25)
| Miles Bridges (10)
| Bridges, Graham, Wanamaker (6)
| Spectrum Center3,240
| 30–31
|-style="background:#fcc;"
| 62
| April 28
| @ Boston
| 
| Devonte' Graham (25)
| Cody Martin (9)
| Graham, Rozier (7)
| TD Garden2,298
| 30–32

|-style="background:#cfc;"
| 63
| May 1
| Detroit
| 
| Terry Rozier (29)
| Biyombo, McDaniels (9)
| LaMelo Ball (8)
| Spectrum Center3,776
| 31–32
|-style="background:#fcc;"
| 64
| May 2
| Miami
| 
| P. J. Washington (21)
| Jalen McDaniels (9)
| Brigdes, Ball, Graham, Monk (5)
| Spectrum Center4,095
| 31–33
|-style="background:#cfc;"
| 65
| May 4
| @ Detroit
| 
| LaMelo Ball (23)
| Jalen McDaniels (12)
| Ball, Rozier (6)
| Little Caesars Arena750
| 32–33
|-style="background:#fcc;"
| 66
| May 6
| Chicago
| 
| P. J. Washington (24)
| Terry Rozier (8)
| LaMelo Ball (9)
| Spectrum Center3,769
| 32–34
|-style="background:#cfc;"
| 67
| May 7
| Orlando
| 
| Terry Rozier (28)
| Bismack Biyombo (11)
| Ball, Rozier (6)
| Spectrum Center3,751
| 33–34
|-style="background:#fcc;"
| 68
| May 9
| New Orleans
| 
| Terry Rozier (43)
| P. J. Washington (12)
| LaMelo Ball (5)
| Spectrum Center4,196
| 33–35
|-style="background:#fcc;"
| 69
| May 11
| Denver
| 
| Devonte' Graham (31)
| LaMelo Ball (12)
| LaMelo Ball (7)
| Spectrum Center3,997
| 33–36
|-style="background:#fcc;"
| 70
| May 13
| L. A. Clippers
| 
| LaMelo Ball (18)
| Bismack Biyombo (7)
| LaMelo Ball (7)
| Spectrum Center4,442
| 33–37
|-style="background:#fcc;"
| 71
| May 15
| @ New York
| 
| Miles Bridges (30)
| Cody Zeller (11)
| Devonte' Graham (8)
| Madison Square Garden1,981
| 33–38
|-style="background:#fcc;"
| 72
| May 16
| @ Washington
| 
| Terry Rozier (22)
| Rozier, Washington (9)
| Terry Rozier (9)
| Capital One Arena5,333
| 33–39

Play-in 

|-style=background:#fcc;"
| 1
| May 18
| @ Indiana
| 
| Miles Bridges (23)
| Bridges, Rozier (8)
| Terry Rozier (6)
| Bankers Life Fieldhouse0
| 0–1

Player statistics

|-
| align="left"|||51 ||31  ||28.8 ||.436 ||.352  ||.758  ||5.9  ||6.1  ||1.6  ||.4  ||15.7  ||
|-
| align="left"| ||66  ||36  ||20.4  ||.587  ||.000  ||.448  ||5.3  ||1.2  ||.3  ||1.1  ||5.0
|-
| align="left"| ||66  ||19  ||29.3  ||.503  ||.400  ||.867  ||6.0  ||2.2  ||.7  ||.8  || 12.7
|-
| align="left"| ||19  ||4  ||6.1  ||.500  ||.143  ||.818 ||1.4  ||.1  ||.1  ||.3  ||2.4
|-
| align="left"| ||7  ||0  ||3.7  ||.286  ||.286  ||1.000  ||.1  ||.1  ||.0  ||.1  || 1.3
|-
| align="left"| ||55  ||44  ||30.2  ||.377  ||.375  ||.842  ||2.7  ||5.4  ||.9  ||.1  ||14.8
|-
| align="left"| ||44  ||44  ||34.0  ||.473  ||.415  ||.843  ||5.9  ||4.1  ||1.2  ||.3  ||19.6
|-
| align="left"| ||53  ||3 ||15.4  ||.375  ||.248  ||.641 ||2.7  ||1.3  ||.7  ||.2  ||5.0
|-
| align="left"| ||52  ||10  ||16.3  ||.441  ||.276  ||.581  ||3.1  ||1.7  ||.7  ||.2  ||4.0
|-
| align="left"| ||47  ||18  ||19.2  ||.468  ||.333  ||.703  ||3.6  ||1.1  ||.6  ||.4  ||7.4
|-
| align="left"| ||42  ||0  ||20.9  ||.434  ||.401  ||.819  ||2.4  ||2.1  ||.5  ||.1  ||11.7
|-
| align="left"| ||18  ||0  ||3.5  ||.444  ||.000  ||.636  ||.6  ||.1  ||.0  ||.0  ||.8
|-
| align="left"| ||7  ||0  ||3.9  ||.667  ||.500  ||-  ||.1  ||.4  ||.1  ||.0  ||2.6
|-
| align="left"| ||69  ||69  ||34.5  ||.450  ||.389  ||.817  ||4.4  ||4.2  ||1.3  ||0.4  ||20.4
|-
| align="left"| ||22  ||0  ||19.5  ||.429  ||.125  ||.889  ||1.8  ||3.4  ||.8  ||.2  ||6.9
|-
| align="left"| ||64  ||61  ||30.5  ||.440  ||.386  ||.745  ||6.5  ||2.5  ||1.1  ||1.2  ||12.9
|-
| align="left"| ||48  ||21  ||20.9  ||.559  ||.143  ||.714  ||6.8  ||1.8  ||.6  ||.4  ||9.4
|}
After all games.

Transactions

Trades

Free agents

Re-signed

Additions

Subtractions

References

Charlotte Hornets seasons
Charlotte Hornets
Charlotte Hornets
Charlotte Hornets